The 2005 Men's Youth World Handball Championship (1st tournament) took place in Qatar from 3 August to 11 August.

Preliminary round

Group A

Group B

Placement matches

9th/10th

7th/8th

5th/6th

Final round

Semifinals

Bronze-medal match

Gold-medal match

Final standings

Medallists

External links
I Men's Youth World Championship at IHF.info

Handball
World
World Handball Championship youth and junior tournaments
International handball competitions hosted by Qatar